Mage: The Ascension is a role-playing game based in the World of Darkness, and was published by White Wolf Game Studio in 1993. The characters portrayed in the game are referred to as mages, and are capable of feats of magic. Magic in Mage is subjective rather than objective as it incorporates a diverse range of ideas and mystical practices  as well as science and religion. A mage's ability to change reality is based on what they believe rather than an objective or static system of magic. In that regard, most mages do not resemble typical fantasy wizards.

Mage was influenced by then White Wolf game Ars Magica, but the two games have different settings and premises. Similarly, White Wolf released Mage: The Awakening in 2005 for the new World of Darkness series. The new game features some of the same game mechanics but uses a substantially different premise and setting as well.

History
Following the release of Vampire: The Masquerade, White Wolf Publishing released a new roleplaying game each year for the next four years, all of them set in the same World of Darkness of Vampire, and using its Storyteller rule system: Werewolf: The Apocalypse (1992), Mage: The Ascension (1993), Wraith: The Oblivion (1994) and Changeling: The Dreaming (1995). Mage was the first World of Darkness game that Mark Rein-Hagen was not directly involved with, although it featured the Order of Hermes from his Ars Magica as one of its many traditions.

The first edition of the game was released by White Wolf Publishing on August 19, 1993, at the Gen Con gaming convention; they followed it with a second edition in December 1995, and with Revised Edition in March 2000. Onyx Path Publishing released a fourth version, the 20th Anniversary Edition, on September 23, 2015.

Premise
In Mage: The Ascension players play the role of mages, people who discover they have the ability to shape reality through magic. The process of this discovery is what mages call Awakening. Awakening is a mysterious, often traumatic experience, wherein a person's Avatar, a kind of tutelary consciousness or Daemon, "wakes up" within the mage granting them the ability to do magic. Once Awakened, mages can learn to effect changes to reality via will, beliefs and specific magical techniques, but the differences of how they do this forms the central conflict of the game. There are four factions, the Traditions, the Technocracy, the Nephandi, and the Marauders all of whom struggle against one another on all levels of reality from the digital world to the spirit world to the physical world, and even in the world of ideas to covertly persuade the unAwakened masses that their beliefs (also called paradigms) are best. This age-old struggle is called the Ascension War wherein the four factions vie for control of reality itself. The Technocracy is a worldwide conspiracy of hyper-rational mages whose paradigm is considered to dominate reality with their belief that science is the ultimate way to advance humanity. They fight for the extinction of magic and the supernatural (and the belief in magic) and consider their own willworking "awakened science". Depending on edition, they have more or less successfully convinced the unAwakened masses, otherwise known as Sleepers, that magic and the supernatural do not exist and never did. They believe in a safe, predictable, static world where everything is understood and controlled, and nothing is left to chance. They also wish to guide this world from the shadows. The Marauders, on the other hand, are pure change. They are mages who have been driven insane by their mind-bending powers, and are consumed by their own individual beliefs. Chaotic and disorganized, the Marauders pursue their own warped agendas to the exclusion of all else. The Nephandi are forces of corruption and destruction. They are mages who have sold their souls to demonic forces or Lovecraftian horrors in exchange for power in this life. They are committed to the particular agendas of their individual patrons, but all of them pursue the total destruction of everything. The Traditions, which are the default character faction, are a diverse confederacy of wizards, sorcerers, mystics, and mystic-minded technologists and scientists who have banded together to resist the Technocracy's control of reality. Most mages and factions within the game are working towards an occult goal known as Ascension. The nature of Ascension is open to interpretation, and each faction and sub-faction in the game differs on their views of what Ascension is. It may involve a single mage becoming a paragon of their beliefs or transcending them entirely. It could also involve a mass Awakening of the unAwakened (known as Sleepers), or at least mass empowerment through the adoption of a particular practice or belief.

The game was designed to draw characters from the Traditions, and later, members of the Technocracy. Nephandi and Marauder mostly filled the role of antagonists, though it was possible at one point to use them as playable characters. A fifth faction was added in the second edition of the game with the publishing of The Book of Crafts in 1996. Crafts were mystic cultures from around the globe that possessed the ability to do magic, but did not participate directly in the Ascension War (though they would join in some fashion in later editions).

Magic, Paradigm and Belief

The beliefs are an important theme in Mage, and it forms the basis for the game's magic. The magical techniques characters employ vary enormously, from ancient shamanic practices or Medieval sorcery to religious miracle working, or even rational science or science-fiction technology. The extent a mage can alter reality is limited only by their belief. Their beliefs, practices, and tools make up a paradigm which provides the mage with a framework to understand reality or explain how the universe works, and employ techniques to change it according to those beliefs. For example, an alchemical paradigm might describe the act of wood burning as the wood "releasing its essence of elemental Fire," while modern science would describe fire as "combustion resulting from a complex chemical reaction." Paradigms are usually a mix of the cultural beliefs taught to the mage by their faction or sub-faction, and their individual interpretation of them. Some paradigms are ancient or traditional while others are modern or a mix of the new and the old. Some paradigms are rigid while others are more flexible. Players determine what their characters' believe and how that is expressed in their characters' magic.

Reality & Paradox
The idea that what we believe creates reality, and that those ideas create conflicts is also an important theme in the game. Everyday reality is governed by the collective beliefs of Sleepers known as the Consensus. The Consensus more or less mirrors out of character, everyday assumptions about the way the world works. For example, most people have a general understanding that magic or the supernatural do not exist. While this may not be universally true, in Mage, enough people believe it to make it so. Mages have tremendous power to reshape reality, but they must hide this ability from the Sleepers or suffer cosmic consequences. This is another central conflict of the game where the majority of Sleepers believe exclusively in the static reality offered to them by the Technocracy, but the truth is that all paradigms are potentially valid. Despite their power all Mages, even members of the Technocracy, must couch their magic in the belief of the Sleepers in order to avoid the consequences of not doing so. When a mage performs an act of magic that conforms with the Consensus, this is called coincidental magic. It is magic that, if witnessed by a Sleeper, could easily be dismissed as some understandable phenomenon. The main benefit of coincidental magic is that it is easier and less risky to perform than vulgar magic because it works with Sleepers' beliefs rather than defying them. Magic that conflicts with Sleeper belief is called vulgar magic, and this violent clashing of reality, belief, and ideas results in what is called Paradox in the game. When a character fumbles a magical working or changes reality in a manner that conflicts with the Consensus  they incur Paradox in the form of Paradox points. This is made much worse when the magic is vulgar and witnessed by Sleepers. Paradox is reality trying to resolve contradictions between the Consensus and the mage's efforts, and is usually only incurred by the mage who performed the offending magic. How Paradox manifests is up to the Storyteller, and is decided based on how many Paradox points the player has incurred. By nature, Paradox is unpredictable, and almost always spells trouble for the mage. It can manifest in the form of physical damage (Backlash), temporary or last warps in reality around the mage (Paradox flaws), insanity (known as Quiet), or in more extreme cases Paradox Spirits. Paradox Spirits are nebulous, often powerful beings which purposefully set about resolving the contradictions, usually by directly punishing the mage in some manner, sometimes going so far as to transport the mage to a Paradox Realm, a mind-bending pocket dimension from which it may be difficult to escape.

Game setting

History

Early times
In the game, Mages have always existed, though there are legends of the Pure Ones who were shards of the original, divine One. Early mages cultivated their magical beliefs alone or in small groups, generally conforming to and influencing the belief systems of their societies. Obscure myths suggest that the precursors of the modern organizations of mages originally gathered in ancient Egypt. This period of historical uncertainty also saw the rise of the Nephandi in the Near East. This set the stage for what the game's history calls the Mythic Ages.

Until the late Middle Ages, mages' fortunes waxed and waned along with their native societies. Eventually, though, mages belonging to the Order of Hermes and the Messianic Voices attained great influence over European society. However, absorbed by their pursuit of occult power and esoteric knowledge, they often neglected and even abused humanity. Frequently, they were at odds with mainstream religions, envied by noble authorities and cursed by common folk.

The Order of Reason
Mages who believed in proto-scientific theories banded together under the banner of the Order of Reason, declaring their aim was to create a safe world with Man as its ruler. They won the support of Sleepers by developing the useful arts of manufacturing, economics, wayfaring, and medicine. They also championed many of the values that we now associate with the Renaissance. Masses of Sleepers embraced the gifts of early Technology and the Science that accompanied them. As the masses' beliefs shifted, the Consensus changed and wizards began to lose their position as their power and influence waned.

This was intentional. The Order of Reason perceived a safe world as one devoid of heretical beliefs, ungodly practices and supernatural creatures preying upon humanity. As the defenders of the common folk, they intended to replace the dominant magical groups with a society of philosopher-scientists as shepherds, protecting and guiding humanity. In response, non-scientific mages banded together to form the Council of Nine Traditions where mages of all the major magical paths gathered. They fought on battlefields and in universities trying to undermine as many discoveries as they could, but to no avail – technology made the march of Science unstoppable. The Traditions' power bases were crippled, their believers mainly converted, their beliefs ridiculed all around the world. Their final counteroffensives against the Order of Reason were foiled by internal dissent and treachery in their midst.

Rise of the Technocracy
However, from the turn of the 17th century on, the goals of the Order of Reason began to change. As their scientific paradigm unfolded, they decided that the mystical beliefs of the common people were not only backward, but dangerous, and that they should be replaced by cold, measurable and predictable physical laws and respect for human genius. They replaced long-held theologies, pantheons, and mystical traditions with ideas like rational thought and the scientific method. As more and more sleepers began to use the Order's discoveries in their everyday lives, Reason and rationality came to govern their beliefs, and the old ways came to be regarded as misguided superstition. However, the Order of Reason became less and less focused on improving the daily lives of sleepers and more concerned with eliminating any resistance to their choke-hold on the minds of humanity. Ever since a reorganization performed under Queen Victoria in the late 1800s, they call themselves the Technocracy.

Contemporary setting
The Technocracy espouses an authoritarian rule over Sleepers' beliefs, while suppressing the Council of Nine's attempts to reintroduce magic. The Traditions replenished their numbers (which had been diminished by the withdrawal of two Traditions, the secretive Ahl-i-Batin, and the Solificati, alchemists plagued by scandal) with former Technocrats from the Sons of Ether and Virtual Adepts factions, vying for the beliefs of sleepers and with the Technocracy, and perpetually wary of the Nephandi (who consciously embrace evil and service to a demonic or alien master) and the Marauders (who resist Paradox with a magical form of madness). While the Technocracy's propaganda campaigns were effective in turning the Consensus against mystic and heterodox science, the Traditions maintained various resources, including magical nodes, hidden schools and fortresses called Chantries, and various realms outside of the Consensus in the Umbra.

Finally, from 1997 to 2000, a series of metaplot events destroyed the Council of Nine's Umbral steadings, killing many of their most powerful members. This also cut the Technocracy off from their leadership. Both sides called a truce in their struggle to assess their new situation, especially since these events implied that Armageddon was soon at hand. Chief among these signs was creation of a barrier between the physical world and spirit world. This barrier was called the Avatar Storm because it affected the Avatar of the Mage. This Avatar Storm was the result of a battle in India on the so-called "Week of Nightmares."

These changes were introduced in supplements for the second edition of the game and became core material in the third edition.

Later plot and finale
Aside from common changes introduced by the World of Darkness metaplot, mages dealt with renewed conflict when the hidden Rogue Council and the Technocracy's Panopticon encouraged the Traditions and Technocracy to struggle once again. The Rogue Council only made itself known through coded missives, while Panopticon was apparently created by the leaders of the Technocracy to counter it.

This struggle eventually led to the point on the timeline occupied by the book called Ascension. While the entire metaplot has always been meant to be altered as each play group sees fit, Ascension provided multiple possible endings, with none of them being definitive (though one was meant to resolve the metaplot). Thus, there is no definitive canonical ending. Since the game is meant to be adapted to a group's tastes, the importance of this and the preceding storyline is largely a matter of personal preference.

Factions
The metaplot of the game involves a four-way struggle between the technological and authoritarian Technocracy, the insane Marauders, the cosmically evil Nephandi and the nine mystical Traditions (that tread the middle path), to which the player characters are assumed to belong. (This struggle has in every edition of the game been characterized both as primarily a covert, violent war directly between factions, and primarily as an effort to sway the imaginations and beliefs of sleepers.)

Council of Nine Mystic Traditions

The Traditions (formally called the Nine Mystic Traditions) are a alliance of secret societies in the Mage: the Ascension role-playing game. The Traditions exist to unify users of magic under a common banner to protect reality (particularly those parts of reality that are magical) against the growing disbelief of the modern world, the spreading dominance of the Technocracy, and the predations of unstable mages such as Marauders and Nephandi. Each of the Traditions are largely independent organizations unified by a broadly accepted paradigm for practicing magic. The Traditions themselves vary substantially from one another. Some have almost no structure or rules, while others have rigid rules of protocol, etiquette, and rank. Though unified in their desire to keep magic alive, the magic practiced by different Traditions are often wildly different and entirely incompatible with one another.  Understanding Traditions as a whole requires understanding each Tradition separately, and then assembling them into a somewhat cohesive whole.

The nine traditions are: the Akashic Brotherhood, Celestial Chorus, Cult of Ecstasy, Dreamspeakers, Euthanatos, Order of Hermes, Sons of Ether, Verbena and Virtual Adepts. 
Mages of Akashic Brotherhood are ascetics, martial artists, and monks, largely drawing from Buddhism, Taoism, Shinto, Hinduism and other such religions. They are masters of the sphere of Mind.
Mages of Celestial Chorus are pious believers in a supreme being that encompasses many religions that believe in one supreme creator. They are masters of the sphere of Prime, the raw essence that fuels magic itself.
Mages of Cult of Ecstasy are intuitive seers using sensory stimulation, consciousness-expanding techniques, and meditation. They are masters of the sphere of Time.
Mages of Dreamspeakers are shamanistic emissaries to the spirit world. They are masters of Spirit magic, such as summoning or binding spirits, necromancy, creating fetishes and travelling to the Umbra.
Mages of Euthanatos are Thanatoic willworkers and killers drawing from a legacy of death-cults in India, Greece, and the cultures of the Arabs and Celts. They are masters of the sphere of Entropy.
Mages of Order of Hermes are formalized sorcerers, alchemists, and mystics drawing from classical occult practices. They are masters of the sphere of Forces.
Mages of Sons of Ether are inspiration-oriented scientists dedicated to fringe theories and alternative science. They are masters of the sphere of Matter.
Mages of Verbena are blood-shamans, healers, primordial witches and warlocks. They are masters of the sphere of Life.
Mages of Virtual Adepts are technological adepts capable of informational wizardry. They are masters of the sphere of Correspondence, magic dealing with three-dimensional location, space, and communications.

The Technocratic Union

The Technocracy is likewise divided into groups; unlike the Traditions, however, they share a single paradigm, and instead divide themselves based upon methodologies and areas of expertise.

 Technocrats of Iteration X are experts in the arena of the physical sciences, especially when it comes to mechanical and robotic advancements.
 Technocratic Progenitors, on the other hand, are masters of the biological sciences as a whole, including genetic engineering and the medical science. 
 Technocrats of the New World Order maintain control of information and knowledge, controlling the thoughts and actions of the masses by directing what they learn and see.
 Technocrats of the Syndicate control the flow of money and power—though the two are frequently the same thing—between disparate groups.
 Technocratic members of the Void Engineers are explorers of the unknown. In the modern day, this not only extends to outer space, but to extradimensional planes of existence.

Marauders

The Marauders are a group of mages that embody Dynamism. Marauders are chaos mages. They are completely insane. To other mages, they appear immune to paradox effects, often using vulgar magic to accomplish their insane tasks. Marauders represent the other narrative extreme, the repellent and frightening corruption of unrestrained power, of dynamism unchecked. Marauders are insane mages whose Avatars have been warped by their mental instability, and who exist in a state of permanent Quiet. While the nature of a Marauder's power may make them seem invincible, they are still severely hampered by their madness. They cannot become Archmages, as they lack sufficient insight and are incapable of appreciating truths which do not suit their madness. In the second edition of Mage: The Ascension, Marauders were much more cogent and likely to operate in groups, with the Umbral Underground using the Umbra to infiltrate any location and wreak havoc with the aid of bygones. They were also associated heavily with other perceived agents of Dynamism, particularly the Changing Breeds (who equate Dynamism with the Wyld) and sometimes Changelings. For example, the Marauders chapter in The Book of Madness is narrated by a Corax (were-raven) named Johnny Gore, who relates his experiences running with the Butcher Street Regulars. In the revised edition, Marauders were made darker and less coherent, in keeping with the more serious treatment of madness used for Malkavians in Vampire: The Masquerade Revised Edition. The Avatar Storm was a very convenient explanation for the Underground's loss of power and influence, though they also became more vulnerable to Paradox. In this edition, the Regulars are a cell of the Underground, and like the other cells have highly compatible Quiets.

Nephandi

With the Technocracy representing Stasis and the Marauders acting on behalf of Dynamism, the third part of this trifecta is Entropy, as borne by the Nephandi.  While other mages may be callous or cruel, the Nephandi are morally inverted and spiritually mutilated. While a Traditionalist or Technocrat may simply fall prey to human failings or excessive zeal in their ethos, while a Marauder may well commit some true atrocities in the depth of her incurable madness; a Nephandus retains a clear moral compass, and deliberately pursues actions to worsen the world and bring about its final end. To this end, the Technocracy and Traditions have been known to set aside the ongoing war for reality to temporarily join forces to oppose the Nephandi, and even the Marauders are known to attack the Nephandi on sight. Some of their members, called barabbi, hail from the Technocracy and Traditions, but all Nephandi have experienced the Rebirth, wherein they embrace the antithesis of everything they know to be right, and are physically and spiritually torn apart and reassembled. This metamorphosis has a sort of terrible permanence to it:  while each Mage's avatar will be reborn again and again, theirs is permanently twisted as a result of their rebirth: known as Widderslainte, these mages awaken as Nephandi. While some of the background stories detail a particular mage and her teacher trying—and succeeding—at keeping her from falling again, this is very rare.

The Disparate Alliance

The Disparate Alliance is a newly created network of independent Crafts that have chosen to take the matters of the Ascension War into their own hands, independently from the Technocratic Union or the Council of Nine Mystick Traditions. During the Age of Information, small mage societies and groups called crafts began reaching out to each other. With no desire to join the Traditions and a general hatred for the Technocracy that ordered pogroms to wipe them out, they decided to band together for mutual aid and survival. 

The five founding crafts are 

The Ahl-i-Batin, Arabian mages originally based in the Middle East and North Africa, this group has expanded worldwide. They practice magic with a strong focus on subtlety, and have dreams of bringing Unity to the world.

The Children of Knowledge, former members of a group called the Solificati, are LSD and other psychedelic using alchemists hoping that these drugs can open peoples minds. 

The Hollow Ones, mages who have either been orphaned by or rejected the Traditions, and refused to join forces with the Technocracy. Instead, they are a craft composed of ragtags and anti establishments who take what they like from every tradition and fuse it together. Their magic often uses whatever they have to work with, referred to as gutter magic. They draw members from various subcultures and counterculture groups ranging from afrofuturists, cosplayers, cybergoths, emo's, goths, new agers, skaters, hip hop, and ballroom voguers. 

The Ngoma, proud sub saharan african ritualists and knowledge-seekers that strive to unravel the mysteries of the cosmos and the gods.

The Bata'a, Followers of voodoo, vodun, Santería, Candomblé, Obeah, Hoodoo, and other Afro-Caribbean religions

They were then joined by five other crafts

The Kopa Loei, Polynesian mystics who are working to return ancient wisdom and culture to their people and balance to their islands.

The Knights of the Temple of Solomon, also known as Knights Templar. A magickal order of knights dedicated to the christian God.

The Sisters of Hippolyta, feminist holistics with roots to the ancient warrior Amazons. 

The Taftâni, Djinn binding Persian mages who have a disdain for subtle magic and craft bold spells and displays of magic.

The Wu Lung, Confucian dragon wizards who practice chinese high ritual magic, alchemy, and a special fighting technique known as Kuei Lung Chuan.

Other Crafts that have been considered for membership include:

The Balamob, jaguar-priests from Central America

The Thunder Society, North American native shamans that shun contact to the Dreamspeakers and are working to heal their communities and tribes.

The Uzoma, Yoruban mediums and spirit intercessors

The Navalon, breakaways from the Utopian faction within the Technocracy who revere the ideal of Camelot and King Arthur

The Mirainohmen, Japanese technomystical tricksters who use psychic bonds with technological spirits in order to rearrange identities and undermine social preconceptions.

The Red Thorn Dedicants, a cult of magic-using Bahari that revere Lilith

The Itz'at, Mesoamerican seers and prophets

The Go Kamisori Gama, technomantic ninja assassins with a vendetta against the Technocratic Union

Rules and continuity
The core rules of the game are similar to those in other World of Darkness games; see Storyteller System for an explanation.

Like other storytelling games Mage emphasizes personal creativity and that ultimately the game's powers and traits should be used to tell a satisfying story. One of Mage's highlights is its system for describing magic, based on spheres, a relatively open-ended 'toolkit' approach to using game mechanics to define the bounds of a given character's magical ability. Different Mages will have differing aptitudes for spheres, and player characters' magical expertise is described by allocation of points in the spheres.

There are nine known spheres:

Correspondence
Deals with spatial relations, giving the Mage power over space and distances. Correspondence magic allows powers such as teleportation, seeing into distant areas, and at higher levels the Mage may also co-locate herself or even stack different spaces within each other. Correspondence can be combined with almost any other sphere to create effects that span distances.

Entropy
This sphere gives the Mage power over order, chaos, fate and fortune. A mage can sense where elements of chance influence the world and manipulate them to some degree. At simple levels machines can be made to fail, plans to go off without a hitch, and games of chance heavily influenced. Advanced mages can craft self-propagating memes or curse entire family lines with blights. The only requirement of the Entropy sphere is that all interventions work within the general flow of natural entropy.

Forces
Forces concerns energies and natural forces and their negative opposites (i.e. light and shadow can both be manipulated independently with this Sphere). Essentially, anything in the material world that can be seen or felt but is not material can be controlled: electricity, gravity, magnetism, friction, heat, motion, fire, etc. At low levels the mage can control forces on a small scale, changing their direction, converting one energy into another. At high levels, storms and explosions can be conjured. Obviously, this Sphere tends to do the most damage and is the most flashy and vulgar. Along with Life and Matter, Forces is one of the three 'Pattern Spheres' which together are able to mold all aspects of the physical world.

Life
Life deals with understanding and influencing biological systems. Generally speaking, any material object with mostly living cells falls under the influence of this sphere. Simply, this allows the mage to heal herself or metamorphose simple life-forms at lower levels, working up to healing others and controlling more complex life at higher levels. Usually, seeking to improve a complex life-form beyond natural limits causes the condition of pattern bleeding: the affected life form begins to wither and die over time. Along with Matter and Forces, Life is one of the three Pattern Spheres.

Mind
Dealing with control over one's own mind, the reading and influencing of other minds, and a variety of subtler applications such as Astral Projection and psychometry. At high levels, Mages can create new complete minds or completely rework existing ones.

Matter
Matter deals with all inanimate material. Thus, being alive protects a thing from direct manipulation by the Matter sphere. Stone, dead wood, water, gold, and the corpses of once living things are only the beginning. With this Sphere, matter can be reshaped mentally, transmuted into another substance, or given altered properties. Along with Life and Forces, Matter is one of the three Pattern Spheres.

Prime
This sphere deals directly with Quintessence, the raw material of the tapestry, which is the metaphysical structure of reality. This sphere allows Quintessence to be channeled and/or funneled in any way at higher levels, and it is necessary if the mage ever wants to conjure something out of nothing (as opposed to transforming one pattern into another). Uses of Prime include general magic senses, counter-magic, and making magical effects permanent.

Spirit
This sphere is an eclectic mixture of abilities relating to dealings with the spirit world or Umbra. It includes stepping into the Near Umbra right up to traveling through outer space, contacting and controlling spirits, communing with your own or others' avatars, returning a Mage into a sleeper, returning ghosts to life, creating magical fetish items, and so forth. Unlike other Spheres, the difficulty of Spirit magic is often a factor of the Gauntlet, making these spells more difficult for the most part. The Sphere is referred to as Dimensional Science by the Technocratic Union.

Time
This sphere deals with dilating, slowing, stopping or traveling through time. Due to game mechanics, it is simpler to travel forward in time than backwards. Time can be used to install delays into spells, view the past or future, and even pull people and objects out of linear progression. Time magic offers one means to speed up a character to get multiple actions in a combat round, a much coveted power in turn-based combat.

The tenth sphere
One of the plot hooks that the second edition books put forth were persistent rumors of a "tenth sphere". Though there were hints, it was deliberately left vague. The final book in the line, Ascension implies that the tenth sphere is the sphere of Ascension (in as much as spheres are practically relevant at that point in the story). As the book presents alternative resolutions for the Mage line, Chapter Two also presents an alternative interpretation that the tenth sphere is "Judgement" or "Telos" and that Anthelios (the red star in the World of Darkness metaplot) is its planet (each sphere has an associated planet and Umbral realm).

Sphere sigils
The various sphere sigils are, in whole or in part, symbols taken from alchemical texts.

 Correspondence is a symbol for amalgam or amalgamation, "Amalgama".
 Entropy is a symbol for rotting or decay, "Putredo/putrefactio".
 The sigil of Forces is part of the symbol for "boiling," "Ebbulio".
 Life is a symbol for composition, "Compositio".
 As with Correspondence, the sigil of Matter is another symbol for the process of amalgamation, "Amalgama".
 Mind is a symbol for solution, "Solutio".
 Prime is a symbol meaning essence, "Essentia".
 Spirit may be derived from the symbol for fumes, "Fumus".
 Time is the symbol for dust, "Pulvis".
 The tenth symbol depicted in Ascension is a symbol for vinegar.  Mage: The Sorcerer's Crusade also presented a symbol for the tenth sphere, a combination of the symbols for stone and distillation.

The third revision of the rules, Mage: The Ascension Revised, made significant changes to the rules and setting, mainly to update Mage with respect to its own ongoing storyline, particularly in regards to events that occurred during the run of the game's second edition. (Like other World of Darkness games, Mage uses a continuing storyline across all of its books).

Reception
Adam Tinworth of Arcane gave Mage: The Ascension second edition a score of 8/10, calling it good for those who like involving and challenging games; he noted that it could be difficult for new players to grasp the entire background and how magic works, and to develop their own style of magic, but found the gameplay system itself to be easy to understand for newcomers.

Mage: The Ascension was ranked 16th in the 1996 reader poll of Arcane magazine to determine the 50 most popular role-playing games of all time. The magazine's editor Paul Pettengale commented: "Mage is perfect for those of a philosophical bent. It's a hard game to get right, requiring a great deal of thought from players and referees alike, but its underlying theme – the nature of reality – makes it one of the most interesting and mature roleplaying games available."

Awards
 In 1994, Mage: The Ascension was nominated for Casus Belli awards for the best role-playing game of 1993, and ended up in fifth place.
 Mage: The Ascension, 2nd Edition won the Origins Award for Best Roleplaying Rules of 1995.

Reviews
Shadis #27 (May 1996)
Pyramid for Second Edition Revised
Rollespilsmagasinet Fønix (Danish) (Issue 12 - Mar/Apr 1996)
Envoyer (German) (Issue 27 - Jan 1999)

See also
 List of Mage: The Ascension books

References

External links
 Onyx's Path's Mage Page
Wayback Machine archive of White Wolf's Official Mage page

GURPS edition

 
Origins Award winners
Role-playing games introduced in 1993